Loreto, officially the Municipality of Loreto,  is a 1st class municipality in the province of Agusan del Sur, Philippines. According to the 2020 census, it has a population of 43,880 people.

History
It was in the year 1600 (please check this date, Fr. Urios came to Agusan in the 1880s) when the Spaniards first came to the upper reaches of Agusan and discovered the Manobos. In convincing the Manobos to organise themselves and live in a settlement/community, the settlement was given the name of "Loreto" in remembrance of Fr. Urios town in Spain on March 30, 1965.

Rain of fish
On a rainy morning on January 13, 2012, Loreto became nationally notable when it became the site of a rain of fish. Seventy-two small fish were recovered and placed in an aquarium. The Bureau of Fisheries and Aquatic Resources attributes the phenomenon to a waterspout.

Geography

According to the Philippine Statistics Authority, the municipality has a land area of  constituting  of the  total area of Agusan del Sur.

Loreto is a river town situated south-west of Agusan del Sur. It is bounded on the north by La Paz, north-east by Bunawan, and southeast by Veruela. The provinces of Bukidnon and Davao del Norte bound its Western and Southern portions.

Loreto is a strategically situated as a junction point to various destination within Agusan del Sur and nearby provinces.

Climate

Barangays
Loreto is politically subdivided into 17 barangays.

Demographics

In the 2020 census, Loreto had a population of 43,880.

Economy

References

External links
 [ Philippine Standard Geographic Code]

Municipalities of Agusan del Sur